Abdelhakim Aklidou (born 2 July 1997) is a Moroccan professional footballer who plays as a center-back for Iraq Premier League club Al-Minaa.

Career

Club

On 29 October 2020, Ittihad Tanger signed a three-year contract with Aklidou.

On 15 September 2022, Al-Minaa Club announced the signing of three professional players, including Aklidou.

References

External links 
 
 

1997 births
Living people
Moroccan footballers
Association football fullbacks
Chabab Rif Al Hoceima players
Ittihad Tanger players
Botola players
Al-Mina'a SC players
Moroccan expatriate footballers
Expatriate footballers in Iraq